The Teton Dam was an earthen dam in the western United States, on the Teton River in eastern Idaho. It was built by the U.S. Bureau of Reclamation, one of eight federal agencies authorized to construct dams. Located between Fremont and Madison counties, it suffered a catastrophic failure on June 5, 1976, as it was filling for the first time.

The collapse of Teton Dam resulted in eleven deaths, and killed 16,000 livestock. The dam cost about $100 million to build and the federal government paid over $300 million in claims related to its failure. Total damage estimates have ranged up to $2 billion, and the dam was not rebuilt.

History and geology
Interest in building a dam in the eastern Snake River Plain had arisen for many years to control spring runoff and provide a more constant water supply in the summer. The area had suffered a severe drought in 1961, followed by severe flooding in 1962. The Bureau of Reclamation proposed the Teton Dam in 1963 and Congress passed without opposition an authorizing bill the following year. The impounded water would be used to generate hydroelectric power. An environmental impact statement was issued for the dam in 1971, but it did not raise the possibility of a collapse. Lack of funding and site preparation work and questions surrounding the required environmental impact statement stalled the project. Barely 14 pages long, the statement quickly drew the ire of opponents of the project.

On September 27, 1971, several environmental and conservation groups filed a lawsuit in Idaho District Court to stop the construction. Opponents of the dam questioned the project's justifications. They argued that damming a wild and scenic river and destruction of its trout fishery and other wildlife habitat would "replace a unique resource with a vulgar one." The suit questioned the economic return on investment, the bureau's compliance with the National Environmental Policy Act, and the geologic soundness of the dam's location. Concerns over the seismic conditions of the dam site delayed the bid process pending further review by the Department of the Interior. Pressure from Idaho's congressional delegation stopped the review, and in spite of the lawsuit, bids were taken in Idaho Falls on October 29, 1971. The contract was awarded to Morrison-Knudsen Co. of Boise, assisted by Peter Kiewit Sons Co. of Omaha, Nebraska. The $39 million contract was awarded in December 1971. In spite of the lawsuit, work began in February 1972. After various motions, amended complaints, attempted injunctions, and appeals, the suit was dismissed on December 23, 1974.

The eastern Snake River Plain is almost entirely underlain by basalt erupted from large shield volcanos on top of rhyolitic ash-flow tuff and ignimbrites. The tuff, a late-Cenozoic volcanic rock is 1.9 million years old. The dam site is composed of basalt and rhyolite, both of which are considered unsuitable for dam construction because of their high permeability. Test cores, drilled by engineers and geologists employed by the Bureau of Reclamation, showed that the canyon rock at the dam site is highly fissured and unstable, particularly on the right side (as one faces the direction of flow). The bureau planned to seal these fissures by injecting grout into the rock under high pressure to create a grout curtain in the rock.

In addition, an investigation of the area by geologists of the U.S. Geologic Survey indicated that it was seismically active; five earthquakes had occurred within  of the dam site in the previous five years, two of which had been of significant magnitude. This information was provided to the Bureau of Reclamation in a memorandum, but the geologists' concerns were considerably watered down in the 6-month redrafting process before the USGS sent the final version of the memo to the USBR in July 1973.

Some of the fissures were lined with calcite, and rubble filled others. The largest fissures were actually caves. These were not grouted because they were beyond the keyway trench and beyond the area where the bureau had decided grouting was required. This necessitated using twice as much grouting as had been originally anticipated; the total injected grout included 496,515 ft3 of Portland cement, 82,364 ft3 of sand, 132,000 pounds of bentonite, and 418,000 pounds of calcium chloride, injected into 118,179 linear ft of drilled holes.

Later, the report of a committee of the House of Representatives, which investigated the dam's collapse, felt that the discovery of the caves should have been sufficient for the Bureau of Reclamation to doubt its ability to fill them in with grout, but this did not happen.  Even after the dam had failed, the bureau continued to insist that the grouting was appropriate.

In December 1972, concerned about the geological conditions of the Teton River Canyon, USGS geologist David Schleicher wrote about the Teton Dam while it was still under construction, "A final point is that flooding in response to seismic or other failure of the dam—probably most likely at the time of highest water—would make the flood of February 1962 look like small potatoes. Since such a flood could be anticipated, we might consider a series of strategically placed motion-picture cameras to document the process."

Filling 
The dam was completed in November 1975 and filling the reservoir began at the standard rate of  a day. However, snows were heavy that winter, and five months later, the project's construction engineer requested permission to double the filling rate to deal with the additional spring run-off, while continuing to inspect for leaks and monitor the groundwater. A month later,  though monitoring showed that groundwater was flowing a thousand times faster than had been originally anticipated, the filling rate was doubled again, to  a day.

On June 3 and 4, 1976, three small springs were discovered downstream of the dam, although the water running through the leaks was clear and such leaks are not unexpected for an earthen dam. The only structure that had been initially prepared for releasing water was the emergency outlet works, which could carry just . The main outlet works and spillway gates were not yet in service; the gates were cordoned off by steel walls while they were being painted.

Collapse and flood

On Saturday, June 5, 1976, at 7:30 am MDT, a muddy leak appeared, suggesting sediment was in the water, but engineers did not believe there was a problem. Crews with bulldozers were sent to plug the leak, but were unsuccessful. Local media appeared at the site and at 11:15, officials told the county sheriff's office to evacuate downstream residents. Work crews were forced to flee on foot as the widening gap, now larger than a swimming pool, swallowed their equipment. The operators of two bulldozers caught in the eroding embankment were pulled to safety with ropes.

At 11:55 am MDT (UTC−17:55), the crest of the dam sagged and collapsed into the reservoir; two minutes later, the remainder of the right-bank third of the main dam wall disintegrated. Over  (many times the average flow rate of Niagara Falls) of sediment-filled water emptied through the breach into the remaining  of the Teton River canyon, after which the flood spread out and shallowed on the Snake River Plain. By 8:00 pm, the reservoir had completely emptied, although over two-thirds of the dam wall remained standing.

Cause 
Study of the dam's environment and structure placed blame for the collapse on the permeable loess soil used in the core and on fissured (cracked) rhyolite in the abutments of the dam that allowed water to seep around and through the earth-fill dam. The permeable loess was found to be cracked. The combination of these flaws is thought to have allowed water to seep through the dam and to lead to internal erosion, called piping, that eventually caused the dam's collapse.

An investigating panel had quickly identified piping as the most probable cause of the failure, then focused its efforts on determining how the piping started. Two mechanisms were possible. The first was the flow of water under highly erodible and unprotected fill, through joints in unsealed rock beneath the grout cap and development of an erosion tunnel. The second was "cracking caused by differential strains or hydraulic fracturing of the core material." The panel was unable to determine whether one or the other mechanism occurred, or a combination:

The fundamental cause of failure may be regarded as a combination of geological factors and design decisions that, taken together, permitted the failure to develop.

A wide-ranging controversy ensued from the dam's collapse. According to the Bureau of Reclamation, bureau engineers assess all reclamation dams under strict criteria established by the Safety of Dams program. Each structure is periodically reviewed for resistance to seismic activity, for internal faults, and for physical deterioration. The dam safety program identified two other dangerous dams – Fontenelle, which very nearly failed 11 years earlier, when it was filled, in a manner similar to the Teton Dam, and again in May 1985; and the Jackson Lake Dam, which would have failed during an earthquake on the nearby Teton Fault.

Deaths, damage, and property claims

When the dam failed, the flood struck several communities immediately downstream, particularly Wilford at the terminus of the canyon, Sugar City, Salem, Hibbard, and Rexburg. Thousands of homes and businesses were destroyed. The small agricultural communities of Wilford and Sugar City were wiped from the river bank. Five of the eleven deaths attributed to the flood occurred in Wilford. The similar community of Teton, on the south bank of the river, is on a modest bench and was largely spared. One Teton resident was fishing on the river at the time of the dam failure and was drowned. An elderly woman living in the city of Teton died as a result of the evacuation.

One estimate placed damage to Hibbard and Rexburg area, with a population of about 10,000, at 80% of existing structures. The Teton River flows through the industrial, commercial, and residential districts of north Rexburg. A significant reason for the massive damage in the community was the location of a lumber yard directly upstream. When the flood waters hit, thousands of logs were washed into town. Dozens of them hit a bulk gasoline-storage tank a few hundred yards away. The gasoline ignited and sent flaming slicks adrift on the racing water. The force of the logs and cut lumber and the subsequent fires practically destroyed the city.

The flood waters traveled west along the route of the Henrys Fork of the Snake River, around both sides of the Menan Buttes, significantly damaging the community of Roberts. The city of Idaho Falls, even further down on the flood plain, had time to prepare. At the older American Falls Dam downstream, engineers increased discharge by less than 5% before the flood arrived. That dam held and the flood was effectively over, but tens of thousands of acres of land near the river were stripped of fertile topsoil.

The force of the failure destroyed the lower part of the Teton River, washing away riparian zones and reducing the canyon walls. This seriously damaged the stream's ecology and impacted the native Yellowstone cutthroat trout population. The force of the water and excessive sediment also damaged stream habitat in the Snake River and some tributaries, as far downstream as the Fort Hall bottoms.

After the dam's collapse, debris clean-up began immediately and took the remainder of the summer. Rebuilding of damaged property continued for several years. Within a week after the disaster, President Gerald Ford requested a $200 million appropriation for initial payments for damages, without assigning responsibility for Teton Dam's failure.

The Bureau of Reclamation set up claims offices in Rexburg, Idaho Falls, and Blackfoot. By January 4, 1977, disaster victims filed over 4,800 claims totalling $194 million. By that date, the federal government paid 3,813 of those claims, $93.5 million. Originally scheduled to end in July 1978, the claims program continued into the 1980s. At the end of the claims program in January 1987, the federal government had paid 7,563 claims for a total amount of $322 million.

No plans have been made for rebuilding the Teton Dam, but its reconstruction has been discussed over the years since its failure.

Footage and interviews are featured in Catastrophe-No Safe Place (1980), hosted by Charles Bronson and Jill Ireland.

See also
Great Sheffield Flood
St. Francis Dam, a concrete dam near Los Angeles, which failed in 1928 resulting in over 400 deaths
Fontenelle Dam, an earthen dam in southwest Wyoming, which partially failed in 1965 but remains in operation

References

External links

 Bureau of Reclamation overview with photos and link to final report
 The Teton Basin Project, Eric A. Stene, Bureau of Reclamation History Program, 1996
 "The Bureau That Changed the West" One That Got Away: Teton Dam
 Teton Dam Flood Museum, Rexburg, Idaho
 Teton Dam Collection – Oral History reports and newspaper articles, includes more than 50 oral history interviews of those living in the area when the disaster occurred.
 Images showing progressive dam erosion damage, taken at the time by Mrs. Eunice Olson
 Teton Dam Failure Narrative
 Teton River Canyon, ID Teton Dam Collapse and Flooding, Jun 1976 at GenDisasters.com
 Johnson, Elaine, "Teton Dam Flood, June 5, 1976" now at http://www.fremont.idgenweb.org/history-flood.html
 Watch Catastrophe-No Safe Place (1980) on the Internet Archive

1976 floods in the United States
1976 in Idaho
Dams completed in 1976
Dam failures in the United States
Dams in Idaho
Disasters in Idaho
Environmental disasters in the United States
Buildings and structures in Fremont County, Idaho
Buildings and structures in Madison County, Idaho
United States Bureau of Reclamation dams